Niko Semlitsch (born 27 November 1946) is a retired German football defender and later manager.

References

1946 births
Living people
German footballers
Kickers Offenbach players
1. FC Saarbrücken players
Association football defenders
Bundesliga players
2. Bundesliga players
German football managers
Kickers Offenbach managers
FSV Frankfurt managers